Archaean may refer to:

 Archaean or Archean, a geologic eon between Hadean and Proterozoic
 Something related to Archaea, a domain of single-celled microorganisms